Daniel Esteban Ríos (born March 29, 2003) is a professional footballer who plays as a midfielder for Major League Soccer club Houston Dynamo. Born in the United States, he represents the El Salvador national team.

Club career

Houston Dynamo 
Ríos joined the Houston Dynamo Academy in 2013 at the age of 10. On July 10, 2020, he signed a Homegrown Player contract with the Dynamo, effective January 1, 2021.  Ríos spent the remainder of the 2020 training with the first team and playing for the academy.

Ríos made no first team appearances during the 2021 season.  He spent 2022 playing with Houston Dynamo 2 in MLS Next Pro, making 6 appearances.

International career
Born in the United States, Ríos is of Salvadoran descent. He was eligible to represent both the U.S. and El Salvador. On March 4, 2021,  Ríos announced that he would represent El Salvador internationally.  He made his debut for El Salvador on June 26, 2021, coming on as a substitute in a 0–0 draw with Guatemala in a friendly

Career statistics

Club

International

References

External links
 
 
 MLS Soccer Profile

2003 births
Living people
Salvadoran footballers
El Salvador international footballers
American soccer players
American sportspeople of Salvadoran descent
Association football midfielders
Soccer players from Houston
MLS Next Pro players